HMS Blanche was the second of two Blonde-class scout cruisers built for the Royal Navy in the first decade of the 20th century. She led the 1st Destroyer Flotilla from completion until 1912 and was then briefly transferred to the 4th Destroyer Flotilla before the ship was assigned to the 3rd Battle Squadron in 1913. During World War I, Blanche was assigned to several different battleship squadrons of the Grand Fleet. She was present at, but did not fight in, the Battle of Jutland in mid-1916. The ship was converted into a minelayer in early 1917 and made 16 sorties to lay mines during the war. Blanche was paid off in 1919 and sold for scrap in 1921.

Design and description
Designed to provide destroyer flotillas with a command ship capable of outclassing enemy destroyers with her 10  guns, Blanche proved too slow in service from the start of her career. Her  speed was inadequate to match the  speeds of the destroyers she led in her flotilla.

She was powered by four Parsons steam turbines, each driving one shaft. Her crew consisted of 314 officers and ratings.

Her main armament consisted of 10 breech-loading (BL) four-inch Mk VII guns. The forward pair of guns were mounted side by side on a platform on the forecastle, three pairs were port and starboard amidships, and the two remaining guns were on the centreline of the quarterdeck, one ahead of the other. Her secondary armament was four quick-firing (QF) three-pounder  Vickers Mk I guns and two submerged  torpedo tubes.

As a scout cruiser, the ship was only lightly protected to maximise her speed. Her conning tower was protected by four inches of armour.

Construction and service 
Blanche, the seventh ship of that name, was laid down in No. 5 Slipway at Pembroke Royal Dockyard by Mrs. Munday, wife of Captain Godfrey Mundy, Captain-Superintendent of the dockyard, on 12 April 1909. The ship was launched on 25 November 1910 by Lady Mai Philipps, wife of Sir Owen Philips, Member of Parliament for Pembroke and Haverfordwest. She was completed in November 1910 and served as the flotilla leader of the First Destroyer Flotilla through 1912. On 14 August 1911, the cruiser took part in practice with the flotilla. During the night of 2 October, the ship struck a rock on the Pentland Skerries and suffered damage to her bow and stern. Captain Wilfred Henderson assumed command of the ship and the Fourth Destroyer Flotilla of the First Fleet on 1 May 1912. Blanche had been transferred to the Third Battle Squadron as of 18 June 1913 and Captain Richard Hyde assumed command on 5 July.  Blanche patrolled off the Irish coast in early 1914, during the Home Rule Crisis.

She was still assigned to the 3rd Battle Squadron of the Grand Fleet in Scapa Flow at the start of World War I. On 15 December the ship was badly damaged due to severe weather in the Pentland Firth as she sortied to intercept German ships bombarding ports in Yorkshire and had to return to port for repairs. Blanche was transferred to the Fourth Battle Squadron, joining her sister ship, in January 1916. On 28 February, she was one of three cruisers dispatched to patrol off the Norwegian coast during the hunt for the German raider SMS Greif, although she did not come into contact with the German ship before she was sunk. Captain John Casement relieved Hyde on 21 May. During the Battle of Jutland, she was assigned to a position at the rear of the squadron during the battle and did not fire her guns. By January 1917, Blanche was detached from the Grand Fleet, presumably to be converted into a minelayer and Casement was relieved by Captain The Honourable Reginald Plunkett-Ernle-Erle-Drax on 15 January. The ship had been assigned to the Fifth Battle Squadron by April. Blanche laid mines at the entrance to the Kattegat on the nights of 18/19 and 24/25 February 1918, part of her total of 1,238 mines laid during 16 sorties during the war. Captain Francis Buller assumed command in lieu of Plunkett-Ernle-Erle-Drax on 5 April 1918. He, in turn, was relieved by Captain Charles Wrightson on 7 January 1919. The ship was still assigned to the Fifth Battle Squadron in February, but had been assigned to the Nore Reserve by 1 May, together with Blonde. The sisters were listed for sale by 18 March 1920 and Blanche was sold to Fryer for scrap on 27 July 1921 and broken up at Sunderland.

Notes

Bibliography

External links
Blonde class in World War I
History of HMS Blanche
Blonde class at battleships-cruisers.co.uk
Battle of Jutland Crew Lists Project - HMS Blanche Crew List

Blonde-class cruisers
World War I cruisers of the United Kingdom
1909 ships
Ships built in Pembroke Dock